The Devonian Jeffersonville Limestone is a mapped bedrock unit in Indiana and Kentucky. It is highly fossiliferous.

Description
The Jeffersonville is a coarse grained, dark gray, thick bedded, fossiliferous limestone.

R. D. Perkins (1963) divided the Jeffersonville into five zones based on petrology and fossil content, and these are summarized below (in stratigraphic order):
 Paraspirifer acuminatus zone (top)
 fenestrate bryozoan-brachiopod zone
 Brevispirifer gregarius zone
 Amphipora-zone
 Coral zone (base, overlies Geneva Dolomite or Louisville Limestone)

Fossils
The Jeffersonville Limestone is well known for its fossils, including the well-exposed corals, many in life positions, at Falls of the Ohio.

Edward Kindle described many species from the Falls of the Ohio in 1899: 
Brachiopods: Atrypa aspera, A. reticularis, Chonetes mucronatus, C. yandellanus, Cyrtina hamiltonensis, Derbya keokuk, Discina sp., Leiorhynchus quadricostatum, Orthis iowensis (?), O. livia, Pentamarella arata, Pentamerus nueleus, Productella subamleata var. catarafla, Productus burlingtonensis, Spirifer acuminatus, S. arctisegmentus, S. byrnesi, S. euruteines, S. gregarius, S. keokuk, S. oweni, S. segmentus, S. subattenuatus, Stropheodonta (now Strophodonta) arctostriatus, S. demissa, S. hemispherica, S. perplana, S. varicosus, Syringothyris texta, Terebratula lincklaeni
Rostroconch: Conocardium trigonale (?), C. cuneus
Corals:  Blothorphyllum decorticatum, Conularia micronema, Cyathophyllum rugosum, Diphyphyllum sp., Favosites hemisphericus, Michelinia cylindrica, Thecia minor, Zaphrentis giganteus, Z. ungula
Gastropods: Callonema bellatulum, C. imitator, Platyceras dumosum, Platvstoma lineatum, Trochonema rectilatera, Holopea sp., Pleurotomaria sp., Turbo shumardi
Bivalves: Actinopteria boydi, Aviculopecten sp., Glyptodesma occidentale, Macrodon sp. (?), Modiomorpha affinis, M. mytiloides, Ptychodesma sp.
Trilobites: Proetus canaliculatus, P. crassimarginatus, P. microgemma, Dalmanites anchiops var. sorbrinus, D. selenurus

Campbell and Wickwire (1955) listed the following species in the Jeffersonville from outcrops in the vicinity of Hanover, Indiana:
 Corals: Heliophyllum halli, Hexagonaria prisma, Favosites turoinatus, F. limitaris, Emmonsia emmonsi, E. epidermatus, Synaptophyllum simcoense, Homalophyllum exiguum, Zaphrentis phyrgia, Blothrophyllum promissum, Alveolites sps., Michelinia sps.
 Bryozoa: Sulcoretepona gilberti, Polypora shumardi
 Gastropods: Platyceras dumosum, Bellerophon patulus
 Brachiopods: Paraspirifer acuminatus, Brevispirifer gregarius, Fimbrispirifer divaricatus, Meristina nasuta, Megastrophia hemispherica
 Bivalves: Turbinopsis shumardi, Glyptodesma occidentali, Conocardium cuneus
 Crinoid: Nucleocrinus verneuili
 Trilobites:  Phacops rana, Anchiops anchiops
 Cephalopods: Gyroceras indianense

Other trilobites include the following: Arctinurus sp., Anchiopsis anchiops, Anchiopsis tuberculatus, "Calymene" platys, Coronura aspectans, C. myrmecophorus, C. helena, Crassiproteus clareus, C. crassimarginatus, C. macrocephalus, Greenops kindlei, Odontocephalus bifidus, O. magnus, Odontochile pleuroptyx, Phacops nasutus, Phacops pipa, Trypaulites calypso

Ostracods were documented by Kesling and Peterson in 1958.  Genera identified include: Abditoloculina, Adelphobolbina, Ctenoloculina, Flaccivelum, Hollina, Hollinella, and Subligaculum.

The Blastoids Codaster alternatus and Codaster pyramidatus, among others, were identified by Cline and Heuer in 1950 at Falls of the Ohio.

Notable exposures
Type locality is at Falls of the Ohio State Park near Louisville, Kentucky.

Age
Relative age dating places the Jeffersonville in the lower to middle Devonian. Devera and Fraunfelter identified it as Emsian-Eifelian based on coral and foraminifera.

See also
List of types of limestone

References

External links
 Indiana Geological Survey page on Jeffersonville Limestone
 KYANA Geological Society Devonian page, showing photographs of fossils collected from the Jeffersonville and other formations
 guidebook Silurian and Devonian Geology and Paleontology at the Falls of the Ohio, Kentucky/Indiana, 42nd Annual Meeting of the American Institute of Professional Geologists, fieldtrip guidebook, 2005

 
Devonian System of North America
Limestone formations of the United States
Devonian Indiana
Devonian Kentucky